Jean Louis Marie Poiret (11 June 1755 in Saint-Quentin7 April 1834 in Paris) was a French clergyman, botanist, and explorer.

From 1785 to 1786, he was sent by Louis XVI to Algeria to study the flora.  After the French Revolution, he became a professor of natural history at the Écoles Centrale of Aisne.

The genus Poiretia of the legume family Fabaceae was named after him in 1807 by Étienne Pierre Ventenat.

Selected publications

Coquilles fluviatiles et terrestres observées dans le département de l'Aisne et aux environs de Paris. Prodrome. – pp. i–xi [1–11], 1–119. Paris. (Barrois, Soissons); (1801).  
 Leçons de flore: Cours complet de botanique (1819–1820); (illus. by P. J. F. Turpin).
 
 
 
 
 Voyage en Barbarie, …, pendant les années 1785 et 1786 (1789).
 Histoire philosophique, littéraire, économique des plantes d'Europe; (1825–1829).
 with Jean-Baptiste de Lamarck Encyclopédie méthodique: Botanique; (1789–1817).
 with Jean-Baptiste de Lamarck Tableau encyclopédique et méthodique des trois règnes de la nature: Botanique; (1819–1823).

Tribute
"Poiretia, la revue naturaliste du Maghreb" is a free online natural history journal created in 2008. It discusses (in French) the flora and fauna inventory, description, and mapping in north-western Africa (Maghreb). Its name is dedicated to Jean Louis Marie Poiret, as a tribute to his famous Voyage en Barbarie published in 1789.

References

Further reading
 Zander, Robert et al. (eds.) (1984) Handwörterbuch der Pflanzennamen (13th ed.) Ulmer Verlag, Stuttgart, .

1755 births
1834 deaths
Botanists with author abbreviations
19th-century French botanists
Botanists active in Africa
18th-century French botanists